The James Cook Observatory, or just Cook Observatory was the most eastern astronomical observatory in the world. It was located on Titirangi (Kaiti Hill), Gisborne, North Island, New Zealand. It was named after Captain James Cook. In 2019 it was knocked down due to its structure not being safe.

References

Astronomical observatories in New Zealand
Buildings and structures in the Gisborne District